Moxie is a regional soda in the United States, the eponym of the word "moxie".

Moxie or MOXIE or similar may also refer to:

 boldness, audacity, chutzpah, moxie

People
 Moxie (DJ), a London-based DJ
 Moxiie, a Haitian-American recording artist, singer and songwriter
 Moxie Dalton (1896–1957), U.S. American football player
 Moxie Divis (1894–1955), baseball player
 Moxie Hengel (1857–1924), baseball player
 Moxie Manuel (1881–1924), baseball player
 Moxie Marlinspike, computer security expert
 Moxie Meixell (1887–1982), baseball player
 Moxie Raia (born 1993), U.S. singer

Fictional characters
 Moxie Mannheim, a DC Comics character

Places
 Moxie Mountain, a mountain in Maine, U.S.
 Moxie Falls, a nearby waterfall

Business
 Moxies (also Moxie's), Canadian restaurant chain
 Moxie Beverage Company, the former manufacturer of Moxie regional soda
 The Moxie Institute, a film studio in San Francisco
 Moxie Interactive (aka Moxie), an American interactive marketing agency owned by Publicis Groupe
 Moxie Media, a political consulting firm involved in the Moxie Media scandal
 Moxie Software, an American software company
 Moxie shower head and wireless speaker, a product of the Kohler Co.

Entertainment
 Moxie (film), a 2021 film based on the novel of the same name by Jennifer Mathieu
 Moxie, a 2009 album by British rapper QBoy
 The Moxie Awards, at the Santa Monica Film Festival & Moxie Awards

Other uses
 Moxie (trimaran), historic sailboat launched in 1980
 Mars Oxygen ISRU Experiment (MOXIE), an experimental instrument on the NASA Mars 2020 rover

See also 

 moxie plum, a perennial ground vine
 Moxie Girlz, a brand of fashion dolls
 East Moxie, Maine, USA; a township
 
 Moxey (disambiguation)
 Moxy (disambiguation)